Aaron Ross Flood (December 28, 1910 – May 23, 1995) was an American wrestler who competed in the 1936 Summer Olympics. In 1936, he won the silver medal in the freestyle bantamweight competition. Flood was born in Braman, Oklahoma and died in Stillwater, Oklahoma. In 1978, Flood was inducted into the National Wrestling Hall of Fame as a Distinguished Member.

References

External links
Olympic Profile

1910 births
1995 deaths
Wrestlers at the 1936 Summer Olympics
American male sport wrestlers
Olympic silver medalists for the United States in wrestling
People from Kay County, Oklahoma
Medalists at the 1936 Summer Olympics
20th-century American people